Gerald J. Roper (September 10, 1940 – June 29, 2015) was the President and CEO of the Chicagoland Chamber of Commerce located in Chicago, IL from 1993 until 2013.

As President and CEO of the Chicagoland Chamber of Commerce, Roper led the formation of Chicagoland Entrepreneurial Center, an affiliate of the Chamber. He represented the Chamber on city programs including the Zoning Reform Commission, the Mayor’s Council of Technology Advisors, the Chicago Workforce Board, and Mayoral Task Force on Employment of People With Disabilities. He was chosen by Illinois Governor Rod Blagojevich to be placed on the Governor’s Workers’ Compensation Advisory Board, and the Illinois Abraham Lincoln Bicentennial Commission.

Roper has received numerous awards recognizing his service, including: Meeting Planners International, Chicago Chapter, 1997 Kathy Osterman Industry Award; the 1997 Harold Washington College Distinguished Business Leader Award; the 2000 Roosevelt University Lifetime Achievement Award; the 2003 Illinois Hotel and Lodging Associations Ambassador of Hospitality Award; a Master of Hospitality and Tourism Management Honoris Causa from Roosevelt University, Evelyn T. Stone College of Professional Studies in 2003; and the 2005 Good Citizen Award, from the Chicago Area Council, Boy Scouts of America and the Learning for Life Law Enforcement Luncheon Steering Committee.

A native of Pittsburgh, PA, he resided in the city of Chicago, IL.

Roper was diagnosed with prostate cancer in 2007. He died in Chicago at the age of 74 on June 29, 2015 . He is survived by his wife, Carol.

References

External links
Crain's Chicago Business: A City Business Hub: This Man's Datebook 

American chief executives
Roosevelt University alumni
1940 births
2015 deaths